Conus koukae is a species of sea snail, a marine gastropod mollusk in the family Conidae, the cone snails, cone shells or cones.

These snails are predatory and venomous. They are capable of "stinging" humans.

Description
The size of the shell varies between 35 mm and 47 mm.

Distribution
This marine species occurs off Masirah and Muscat, Oman

References

 Puillandre N., Duda T.F., Meyer C., Olivera B.M. & Bouchet P. (2015). One, four or 100 genera? A new classification of the cone snails. Journal of Molluscan Studies. 81: 1-23
 Monnier E., Limpalaër L. & Robin A., 2013. Revision of the Pionoconus achatinus complex. Description of three new species: P. koukae n. sp. from Oman, P. arafurensis n. sp. from Northern Australia and P. rouxi n. sp. from Western Australia. Xenophora Taxonomy 1: 3--40

External links
 To World Register of Marine Species
 
 Holotype in MNHN, Paris

koukae
Gastropods described in 2013